The Canal du Centre, originally known as the Canal du Charollais, is a French canal running from Digoin, where it now joins the Canal latéral à la Loire, to the Saône at Chalon-sur-Saône. It was opened in 1792 and was the first watershed canal allowing boats to pass from the north of France to the south. Most of its traffic was generated by now abandoned coal mines at Montceau-les-Mines.

History
The canal was first suggested during the 16th century, under King Francis I and a detailed plan was prepared by Adam de Craponne in the time of Henry II. But nothing more happened until the Chief Engineer of Burgundy, Émiland Gauthey obtained building powers in 1783. He selected a route which joined the valleys of the Loire and Saône and provided adequate water supplies at the summit. The first stone was laid in 1784 by Prince de Condé and despite the intervention of exceptional floods on the Loire in 1790, which totally wrecked a new port in Digoin, and the Revolution, the works were completed in 1792.

The canal brought new life to the Charollais and within 20 years of opening, many villages had sprung up along its banks. But the amount of traffic that could be carried towards Paris was limited by the fickle nature of the Loire, and it was estimated that the opening of the Canal latéral à la Loire would triple the toll income of the canal. This happened in 1838, five years after the establishment of coal mines at Montceau-les-Mines, and this increased the traffic until in 1936 some 1,622,000 tonnes of coal was carried on the canal. The coal traffic declined during the 1980s, and the mines were closed in 2000.

Layout
Originally the canal climbed 77.64 m from the Loire to the summit and dropped 130.90 m to the Saône, through a total of 80 locks. These were enlarged in 1880-1900 when they were all rebuilt to the Freycinet gauge and the number of locks was reduced. During the 1950s about 5 km of canal in the centre of Chalon was replaced by a new cut upstream of the town with a single 10.76 m deep lock replacing 3 locks.

Route
Kilometre distances according to 
PK 112 Digoin
PK 99 Paray-le-Monial
PK 80 Génelard
PK 62 Montceau-les-Mines
PK 59 Blanzy
PK 50 Montchanin
PK 42 Saint-Julien-sur-Dheune
PK 31 Saint-Léger-sur-Dheune
PK 22.5 Santenay
PK 17 Chagny
PK 14.5 Rully
PK 6 Fragnes
PK 0 Chalon-sur-Saône

See also
 List of canals in France

References

External links
 Canal du Centre with maps and details of places, ports and moorings on the canal, by the author of Inland Waterways of France, 8th ed., 2010, Imray

 Navigation details for 80 French rivers and canals (French waterways website section)

Navigating the Canal du Centre in 2007

Canals in France
Canals opened in 1792